JazzKamikaze is a contemporary jazz band with members from Denmark, Norway, and Sweden.

Biography 
It is not easy to describe their music, but it can be said that they play a mix of be-bop, funk, fusion, rock and hip-hop.
In Norway they have appeared at Kongsberg Jazzfestival and Moldejazz and internationally at North Sea Jazz Festival, Bangkok Jazz Festival, Rochester Jazz Festival as well as being part of the opening of the annual Rio Carnival in Rio de Janeiro.

Moldejazz presented the band in 2008 as:

Honors 
2005: Ung Jazz award of the JazzDanmark
2005: Young Nordic Jazz Comets

Discography 
2005: Mission I, (Stunt)
2007: Travelling at the Speed of Sound (Stunt) 
2008: Emerging Pilots (SevenSeas)
2009: The Revolution's in Your Hands (SevenSeas)
2010: Supersonic Revolutions (SevenSeas)
2012: The Return of JazzKamikaze (Stunt)
2017: Level (MITU)

Gallery

Personnel 
Morten Schantz (1980 ) - piano & vocals
Marius Neset (1985 ) - saxophone
Daniel Heløy Davidsen (1978 /) - guitar
Kristor Brødsgaard (1979 ) - double bass
Anton Eger (1980 ) - drums

References 

Danish jazz ensembles
Swedish jazz ensembles
Norwegian jazz ensembles
Musical groups established in 2005
2005 establishments in Sweden
Stunt Records artists